The Monte Vista Downtown Historic District, in Monte Vista, Colorado, is a historic district which was listed on the National Register of Historic Places in 1991.  It included nine contributing buildings and some non-contributing ones.

The district is in the area of the junction of 1st Ave. and Washington St.  It includes:
810 First Avenue (1892), a legal office building
806 First Avenue (1892), built of rhyolite stone
State Bank building, 800 First Avenue (1890)
Hunter Mercantile Company, 747 First Avenue (1906)
Monte Vista Armory, 15 Washington Street (1921–22)
Monte Vista Bank and Trust, 803 First Avenue (1918–19)
809 First Avenue (1902)
813/815 First Avenue (1903)
819 First Avenue (1905), Correll-Dunker Candy Kitchen

References

Historic districts on the National Register of Historic Places in Colorado
National Register of Historic Places in Rio Grande County, Colorado
Romanesque Revival architecture in Colorado
Early Commercial architecture in the United States
Buildings and structures completed in 1889